Bang Krathum may refer to:
 Bang Krathum District
 Bang Krathum Subdistrict